Saw Teong Hin is a Malaysian film director, best known for directing the Malay language epic fantasy film Puteri Gunung Ledang and You Mean the World to Me, the first Malaysian film filmed entirely in Hokkien.

Early life and education
Saw was born in George Town, Penang in the year of 1962 to Quah Cheng Sooi and Saw Seng Chuan; both Hokkien people. His paternal grandfather was adopted, likely from his great-grandfather who had conducted businesses in the northern states.

He received a scholarship to study double physics and mathematics at the National University of Singapore, though he never graduated. It was also during this period that he decided to switch interests. Saw felt an immense guilt over his eventual failure, even though his parents would still accept the outcome, thus he went straight to Kuala Lumpur to live on his own after finishing his stint at the university. He took interest in the field of advertising, calling as many agencies as he could asking for any job vacancies available. His calls went unnoticed except for one lady from Ogilvy and Mather who referred him to Joe Hasham, who offers Saw a job in his company as production assistant and later advertisement film director.

Career

Other projects 
Saw was selected to become the creative director for both opening and closing ceremonies of the 2017 Southeast Asian Games.

Filmography

Film

Awards

References

External links 
 

Living people
Malaysian film directors
Saw
Malaysian people of Hokkien descent
Malaysian people of Chinese descent
People from Penang
1962 births